Open Chemistry is a monthly peer-reviewed open access scientific journal covering all fields of chemistry. It is published by Walter de Gruyter. The editor-in-chief is Joaquín Plumet, (Complutense University).

History
The journal was established in 2003 as the Central European Journal of Chemistry. It was co-published by Springer Science+Business Media and Versita (since 2012 part of Walter de Gruyter). By the end of 2014 the journal was moved completely to De Gruyter, obtaining its current title and switching to full open access.

Abstracting and indexing
The journals is abstracted and indexed in:

According to the Journal Citation Reports, the journal has a 2021 impact factor of 1.977.

References

External links

Chemistry journals
Publications established in 2003
English-language journals
De Gruyter academic journals
Creative Commons Attribution-licensed journals